The tawny-breasted tinamou (Nothocercus julius) is a type of ground bird found in montane moist forest. Their range is northwestern South America.

Taxonomy
All tinamou are from the family Tinamidae, and in the larger scheme are also ratites.  Unlike other ratites, tinamous can fly, although in general, they are not strong fliers.  All ratites evolved from prehistoric flying birds, and tinamous are the closest living relative of these birds.

Description
The tawny-breasted tinamou has brown upperparts barred with black, and its wings have buff spots. Below its bright chestnut head, it has a white throat. Its breast and flanks are olivaceous brown, while the rest of its underparts are bright rufous. This tinamou measures  in length.

Behavior
Like other tinamous, the tawny-breasted eats fruit off the ground or low-lying bushes.  They also eat small amounts of invertebrates, flower buds, tender leaves, seeds, and roots. The male incubates the eggs which may come from as many as 4 different females, and then will raise them until they are ready to be on their own, usually 2–3 weeks. The nest is located on the ground in dense brush or between raised root buttresses.

Range
This species is native to the Andes in far western Venezuela, central Colombia, Ecuador, and southern Peru.

Habitat
The tawny-breasted tinamou is a type of ground bird found in montane moist forest up to  altitude.

Conservation

Footnotes

References
 
 
 
 

tawny-breasted tinamou
Tinamous of South America
Birds of the Northern Andes
tawny-breasted tinamou
tawny-breasted tinamou